The climate of Azerbaijan is very diverse. Nine out of eleven existing climate zones are present in Azerbaijan.

Geography
Azerbaijan is situated on the northern extremity of the subtropical zone, in the southeastern part of the Caucasus and the northwestern part of the Iranian plateau. The complicated geographical location and landscape, the proximity of the Caspian Sea, the effect of the sun's radiation, air masses of different origin, etc., contribute to its climatological diversity.

Landscape

As a predominantly mountainous country, Azerbaijan is surrounded by the Greater Caucasus, Lesser Caucasus, Talysh and North Iranian Mountains. The Kur-Araz Lowland, between the Greater and Lesser Caucasus, stretches to the Caspian Sea in the eastern part of the country. The Greater Caucasus, situated in the north of the country and stretching from the northwest to the southeast, protects the country from direct influences of northern cold air masses. That leads to the formation of a subtropical climate on most of the foothills and plains of the country. Other mountain chains surrounding the country also impact air circulation. The complexity of the landscape causes nonuniform formation of climatic zones and creates vertical climate zones.

Solar radiation

The Azerbaijani plains and foothills have high insolation rates. The sun shines for 2,200 to 2,400 hours annually on the Kur-Araz lowland, Apsheron peninsula and other plains and foothills, and 2,600 to 2,800 hours on the plains around the Araz river in the Nakhchivan region. Due to increased cloudiness in the mountainous regions, those areas receive only 1,900 to 2,200 hours of direct sunlight.

The total annual radiation equals 128–132 kcal/cm2 (118–122 kWh/ft2).

The total amount of solar radiation affecting the Araz plains in Nakhchivan totals 148–150 kcal/cm2 (137–139 kWh/ft2). It increases in the mountains, reaching 152–160 kcal/cm2 (140–148 kWh/ft2). The solar radiation on the country's plains and foothills amounts to 40–50 kcal/cm2 (37–46 kWh/ft2); in Lenkoran, 50–60 kcal/cm2 (46–55 kWh/ft2); in the mountains, 15–25 kcal/cm2 (14–23 kWh/ft2).

Circulation of air masses
Climate formation in Azerbaijan is influenced by various air masses. Cold air masses, such as the Kara and Scandinavian arctic anticyclones, the temperate Siberian anticyclones, and the maritime Azores maximum influence the climate. Likewise, tropical hot air masses (subtropical anticyclone and southern cyclones), as well as Central Asian anticyclones and local weather conditions, have influence. These air masses enter the country in different ways thanks to its varied geography. Thus, although they do not prevent the hot masses from entering Azerbaijan from the south, cold continental and maritime air masses cause changes in properties of those hot air masses, and influence the dynamics of the atmosphere .

Major aspects
Some of the major influences on Azerbaijan's climate are temperature, precipitation, humidity, rate of evaporation, and cloud cover.

Temperature

The temperature regime and its distribution throughout Azerbaijan is regular, and depends on the features of air masses entering the country, the regional landscape, and proximity to the Caspian Sea. The sea causes temperatures in the maritime areas ( away from the sea) to decline in the summer and rise in the winter. At the same time, the sea moderates the influence of hot and dry air masses coming from Central Asia.

Both the absolute minimum temperature and the absolute maximum temperature were observed in Julfa and Ordubad.

Examples

Precipitation
The maximum annual precipitation falls in Lankaran and the minimum in the Absheron Peninsula.

Climate types

Taking into consideration the distribution and features of the weather, temperature, humidity, and precipitation, nine out of the 11 climate patterns in the Köppen climate classification can be found in Azerbaijan. Many of these patterns are divided into subtypes.

Annual precipitation accounts for 15 to 50 percent of the possible evaporation. Winters are usually cool (though cold on the Araz River plains along, and in the valleys of, the Talish Mountains).
 Semi-desert and dry steppe climate with cold winter and dry hot climate.
Annual precipitation accounts for 50 to 100 percent of the possible evaporation in this climate zone.
 A moderately warm climate with dry summers covers the Lankaran-Astara region. Annual precipitation accounts for 100 to 150 percent or more of the possible evaporation. Winters are cool, summers are hot and dry, and autumns are rainy. The period of May through August is usually dry, requiring artificial irrigation.
Annual precipitation accounts for 75 to 100 percent of the possible evaporation. Summers are cool and winter is mild.
Annual precipitation accounts for 50 to 100 percent of possible evaporation. Summers are cool, and winter is cold enough for snow.
Annual rainfall accounts for 75 to 100 percent of the possible evaporation in the south hills, and 50 to 100 percent in the northeast hills. Winters are cool, summers warm.
Annual precipitation accounts for more than 150 to 200 percent of the possible evaporation. Winters are cold, summers cool.
 Alpine tundra covers the areas of the Greater and Lesser Caucasus above , and Nakhchivan above . Annual precipitation accounts for more than 100 to 200 percent of the possible evaporation. Winters and summers are both cold. In some places, the snow does not melt until the following winter.

See also
 Geography of Azerbaijan
 Nature of Azerbaijan

Notes

References 

 
Environment of Azerbaijan
Azerbaijan